The Stavropol Higher Military Aviation School of Pilots and Navigators of the Air Defense Forces was an aviation school located in the city of Stavropol (at Stavropol Shpakovskoye Airport), which trained flight personnel (pilots and navigators) for the Soviet Air Defence Forces and Air Forces. 

A directive was issued on September 15, 1969 on the basis of orders of the Minister of Defense of the USSR No. 0022 and No. 080 of 1969 and directive of the General Staff of the Armed Forces of the USSR No. org / 8/87704 of July 18, 1969 on the basis of the branch of the Armavir Higher Military Aviation School of Air Defense located in Stavropol.

In 1993 the school was renamed the Stavropol Higher Aviation Engineering Institute, with schools at Stavropol, Daugavpils and Lomonosov.

References
Michael Holm, Stavropol Higher Military Aviation School of Pilots and Navigators PVO im. Marshal of Aviation V.A. Sudts (SVVAULSh), 2015

Units and formations of the Russian Air Force
Units and formations of the Soviet Air Defence Forces
Flying training schools of the Soviet Union
Training units and formations of air forces
Military units and formations established in 1969
Military units and formations disestablished in 1993